Khaju Kermani tomb is an Iranian tomb. It is located north of Shiraz, on Sabooy hill off the Shiraz–Isfahan road. It is in Allahu Akbar Gorge. His grave overlooks the Qur'an Gate. Roknabad spring passes near the tomb.

History 
The tomb was built in 1315 Solar (1956 AD). 

The tomb is placed in an unroofed enclosure. Its headstone is in the middle of the platform. It is convex and has a bulge. On the stone is inscribed in Arabic a quotation from the Qur'an: 

kullu man ‘alayhā fān; wa-yabqā wajhu rabbika ḏu-l-jalāli wa-l-'ikrām
"Everyone who is on the earth will pass away; and there will remain only the face of your Lord, full of glory and honour."

See also
Khwaju Kermani

References

Buildings and structures in Shiraz
Tombs in Iran